Sakanoue (written: 坂上 or 坂ノ上) is a Japanese surname. Notable people with the surname include:

, Japanese actress
, Japanese samurai
, Japanese waka poet
, Japanese waka poet and son of Sakanoue no Korenori
, Japanese general and shōgun

See also
5862 Sakanoue, a main-belt asteroid

Japanese-language surnames